Wacław Latocha (25 October 1936 – 27 April 2006) was a Polish cyclist. He competed in the 1000m time trial at the 1964 Summer Olympics and in the team pursuit at the 1968 Summer Olympics. He also competed in the 1 km sprint at the 1967 UCI Track Cycling World Championships where he won the silver medal.

References

1936 births
2006 deaths
Olympic cyclists of Poland
Cyclists at the 1964 Summer Olympics
Cyclists at the 1968 Summer Olympics
Polish male cyclists
People from Piotrków County
Sportspeople from Łódź Voivodeship